Xavier Dupré is a typeface designer born in Aubenas (Ardèche), France in 1977. Dupré is notable for the recognition he has received for his typeface designs in the 2000s.

According to several similar online biographies Dupré studied graphic design and applied arts in Paris. He also studied calligraphy and typography at the Scriptorium de Toulouse :fr:Scriptorium de Toulouse. Dupré lived in Cambodia from 2001 to 2004 where he designed Latin typefaces (i.e. fonts used for western European languages) as well as Khmer typefaces.

While Dupré has been a prolific designer since about 2001, three of his typefaces have earned special distinction by the Type Directors Club: FF Angkoon in 2004 , FF Absara in 2005  and Vista Sans in 2006 . More recently, in 2008, Malaga was selected as a "Favorite" of 2007 by online Typographica.org. 

Other typefaces designed by Dupré include FF Parango, 2001 , FF Reminga, 2001 , FF Tartine Script, 2002 , FF Jambono, 2002 , FF Absara Sans, 2005 , Zingha, 2005 , FF Megano, 2005 , FF Sanuk, 2006 , Vista Slab, 2009 , FF Masala, 2009 , FF Masala Script, 2009 , FF Yoga, 2009-2015 , and FF Yoga Sans, 2009 , Mislab, 2013 .

External links
 Personal website
 Biography and overview of his typefaces (FontFont.com)
 Work Inspiration with Xavier Dupré (workspiration.org)

French typographers and type designers
1977 births
Living people